Edson Oliver Sessions (November 5, 1902 Toledo, Ohio – November 15, 1987 Laguna Hills, California) was a consulting engineer from Chicago who served as the American ambassador to Finland (1959–1960) and Ecuador (1968–1970).

Biography
Sessions graduated with a B.S. from Harvard University in 1925. He died at his home in Laguna Hills.

Career
In 1925 he was made Vice President in Charge of Construction for his father's firm, the E.O. Sessions Engineering Company. In 1930, he went to work for Bendix Aviation.  When his father died, Sessions took over his father's business until he sold it in 1954. (Another source says he stayed at Bendix until 1935, when he opened up his own company called Sessions Engineering Company of Chicago). Sessions was appointed Deputy Postmaster General by Dwight D. Eisenhower and served until Lyndon B. Johnson appointed him Ambassador to Ecuador.

References

Ambassadors of the United States to Finland
Ambassadors of the United States to Ecuador
1902 births
1987 deaths
Harvard University alumni
People from Laguna Hills, California
People from Toledo, Ohio
20th-century American engineers
American industrial engineers
United States Postal Service people
Bendix Corporation people
Engineers from Ohio